Bat Wings is a 1992 Norwegian drama film directed by Emil Stang Lund. It was entered into the 18th Moscow International Film Festival where it won the Diploma for Direction.

Cast
 Lars Øyno as Torstein [Felen i ville skogen]
 Frank C. Bjørnsen as Den nye kapp. [Den nye kapellanen]
 Sine Butenschøn as Farmoren [Felen i ville skogen]
 Ricky Danielsson as Dvergen [Felen i ville skogen]
 Jon Eikemo as Jon Vassenden, [Den nye kapellanen]
 Tina Hartvig as Den lyskledte [Hvitsmyre..]
 Liv Heløe as Taterjenta [Felen i ville skogen]
 Knut Mikal Instanes as Vetle-Ola [Den nye kapellanen]
 Roar Kjølv Jenssen as Prestesønn [Hvitsymre..]

References

External links
 

1992 films
1992 drama films
1990s Norwegian-language films
Norwegian drama films